The 2016 FIBA World Olympic Qualifying Tournament in Turin was one of three 2016 FIBA World Olympic Qualifying Tournaments for Men. The tournament was held at the Pala Alpitour in Turin, Italy, from 4 to 9 July 2016.

Teams

Venue
The Pala Alpitour was chosen as the main venue for the tournament. The arena hosted the ice hockey events at the 2006 Winter Olympics

Referees
The following referees were selected for the tournament.

 Arnaud Kom Njilo 
 Yevgeniy Mikheyev
 Jurgis Laurinavičius
 Jorge Vázquez 
 Matej Boltauzer
 Emilio Pérez 
 Milivoje Jovčić
 Borys Shulga

Preliminary round
All times are local (UTC+2).

Group A

Group B

Knockout phase

Semifinals

Final

Final rankings

Statistical leaders

Players

Points

Rebounds
 
Assists

Steals

Blocks

Other statistical leaders

Teams

Points

Rebounds

Assists

Steals

Blocks

Other statistical leaders

Sponsors

See also
2016 FIBA World Olympic Qualifying Tournaments for Men
2016 FIBA World Olympic Qualifying Tournament – Belgrade
2016 FIBA World Olympic Qualifying Tournament – Manila

Notes

References

External links
Official website

Turin
2016–17 in Italian basketball
2016–17 in Greek basketball
2016–17 in Croatian basketball
2016–17 in Iranian basketball
2016 in Mexican sports
2016 in Tunisian sport
International basketball competitions hosted by Italy
Sports competitions in Turin
July 2016 sports events in Europe
2010s in Turin